UDP glucuronosyltransferase 2 family, polypeptide B1, also known as UGT2B1, is an enzyme that in humans is encoded by the UGT2B1 gene.

Function 

The olfactory neuroepithelium, which lines the posterior nasal cavity, is exposed to a wide range of odorants and airborne toxic compounds. Odorants, which are mostly small lipophilic molecules, enter the mucus flow and reach the odorant receptors on sensory neurons. Odorant sensing is generally a transient process, requiring an effective signal termination, which could be provided by biotransformation of the odorant in the epithelial supporting cells. Xenobiotic-metabolizing enzymes in the olfactory epithelium have been suggested to catalyze inactivation and facilitate elimination of odorants. UGT2A1 and UGT2A2 were recently implicated as having a role in the loss of smell associated with COVID-19.

References

Further reading